Prachi Save Saathi (Prācī Sēva Sāthī, born 21 March 1982) is an Indian dancer, actress, and voice-dubbing actress. She can speak English and Hindi.

She is the official Hindi dubbing voice for Disney character, Minnie Mouse. She is also a trained Bharatnatyam dancer and has won a number of prestigious awards. She acted as a child artist in the 1994 Hindi movie Karamati Coat.[2]

Filmography

Animated series

Animated films

Dubbing career
For almost the past 2 decades, Prachi has Hindi voice-dubbed over 200 character roles in foreign animation media in the Indian dubbing industry. She has been voice-acting since 1994.

She is the official Hindi speaking voice for Disney character Minnie Mouse in India (with Parignya Pandya Shah as Minnie's Hindi singing voice) and is approved as the Hindi voice artist for Brenda Song's role as London Tipton from The Suite Life of Zack & Cody. She also performed over Hindi voice-over roles such as Dennis Mitchell from Dennis the Menace, George Little from Stuart Little, Emily Elizabeth Howard from Clifford the Big Red Dog and Clifford's Puppy Days, Vicky the Robot from Small Wonder, Darby and Piglet from My Friends Tigger & Pooh, Lagoona Blue from Monster High, and also Alice from Alice in Wonderland in both live action and animated.

She also known for being the Hindi dubbing voice for Georgie Henley's role as Lucy Pevensie in The Chronicles of Narnia film series.

Dubbing roles

Animated series

Live action television series

Live action films

Animated films

See also
 Javed Jaffrey – Official Hindi dubbing voice for Mickey Mouse and Goofy.
 Vinay Nadkarni – Official Hindi dubbing voice for Donald Duck.
 List of Indian dubbing artists
 Dubbing (filmmaking)

References

External links
 Official website
 

1982 births
20th-century Indian actresses
Indian female dancers
Indian voice actresses
Living people
Actresses from Mumbai
21st-century Indian actresses
Indian film actresses
Dancers from Maharashtra